Savanne or Savannah is a district of Mauritius, situated in the south of the island. The district has an area of 244.8 km2 and the population estimate was at 68,585 as at 31 December 2015. The southern part of the island is one of the most scenic and unspoilt.

History

Places of interest

 Ganga Talao

 The World of Seashells
 Bel Ombre Nature Reserve (also known as Heritage Nature Reserve)
 Macondé View Point

Places
The Savanne District include different regions; however, some regions are further divided into different suburbs.

 Baie-du-Cap 
 Bel-Ombre
 Bénarès
 Batimarias
 Bois-Chéri
 Britannia
 Camp Diable
 Chamouny
 Chemin-Grenier
 Grand-Bois
 La Flora
 Rivière-des-Anguilles
 Rivière Du Poste
 Saint-Aubin
 Souillac
 Surinam

See also

 Districts of Mauritius
 List of places in Mauritius

References 

 
Districts of Mauritius